The Lakdhanavi Power Station (also sometimes referred to as the Lakdhanavi Sapugaskanda Power Station) is a  thermal power station built in Sapugaskanda, Sri Lanka.

See also 
 Asia Power Sapugaskanda Power Station
 Sapugaskanda Power Station
 List of power stations in Sri Lanka

References

External links 
 
 

Oil-fired power stations in Sri Lanka
Buildings and structures in Gampaha District